Hajjah Hetty Koes Endang (born 6 August 1957) is an Indonesian kroncong singer. Her 1977 duet with Ajie Bandi, "Damai Tapi Gersang" ("Peaceful Yet Arid"), was the first Indonesian song to win the World Popular Song Festival in Tokyo. The song was selected by Rolling Stone Indonesia in 2009 as one of the best Indonesian songs of all time.

Biography

Early life and success
Endang was born on 6 August 1957 to Raden Endang Umar, a soldier, and R.S. Koerniwulan, a housewife. She made her musical debut in 1974.

In 1976, Endang and Ajie Bandi performed "Damai Tapi Gersang" ("Peaceful Yet Arid") at the seventh Indonesian Popular Song Festival, in which they placed second. They later won the World Popular Song Festival, held that year at Budokan Hall in Tokyo, Japan, with the song; they were the first Indonesian act to win the festival. Also in 1977 she won the Indonesian Popular Song Festival with Titiek Puspa's "Cinta Putih" ("White Love").

In February 1981, Endang was charged with defamation for telling the press that her birth father was dead (meninggal dunia in Indonesian although can be shorten to "meninggal"), when he was in fact alive; Endang stated that she intended the statement to mean that her father had abandoned all of his responsibilities after divorcing her mother in 1971.

(abandoned all of his responsibilities after divorcing her mother can be translated as "meninggal kan tanggungjawapnya lepas menceraikan ibunya in Indonesian, the word for "abandoned" might be translated to "membiarkan", "meninggalkan" or "usang" depending on the context,Hetty may used the translation of "meninggalkan" while talking to the press but the press might misinterpreted it as "meninggal"(dead) instead, thus creating the misinformation)

 In April she was found not guilty of all charges, which could have brought her three months in jail and six of probation. Later that year Endang won Best Performance at the 1981 Indonesian Popular Song Festival together with her childhood friend Euis Darliah. The pair sang a rock-influenced version of Titik Hamzah's "Siksa" ("Torture"). They then went on to sing at the World Popular Song Festival in Tokyo, which they lost. The following year, she and her family opened Hedick's, a company which worked in import-export; she also opened a fried chicken restaurant in Karet, Central Jakarta.

With the orchestra led by Addie MS, in 1983 Endang won third place at the Chile Song Festival with Titik Hamzah's song "Sayang" ("Dear"); Endang herself was chosen as best singer. In 1984, Endang performed a duet, "Sayang" ("Dear"; written by Eros Djarot and Jockie Soerjoprajogo) with Chrisye on his album Nona; she also provided backing vocals for "Gadis Manja" ("Spoiled Girl"). At first Chrisye was unsure of the duet, as his and Endang's vocal styles were quite different. However, the album was successful. In 1986 she won a BASF Award for Berdiri Bulu Roma-ku (My Spine is Tingling), which sold over a million copies in Indonesia.

Later career
Endang married politician Yusuf Erwin Faishal in July 1991, after two months of courtship. Afterwards she performed internationally, in Kuala Lumpur, Malaysia, and Tokyo. The couple lived in Johor Bahru for five years. In 1996 they went on the hajj to Mecca.

During the New Order, Endang campaigned several times for reigning president Suharto's Golkar party. However, after the fall of Suharto in 1998, she became involved with the National Awakening Party, with her husband, as she had long been part of the sponsor, the Islamic organisation Nahdlatul Ulama. She later recalled that her work with Golkar had been done under external pressure.

In 1999 Endang released Alunan Emas 25 Tahun Kegemilangan (Golden Songs from 25 Years of Joy), a compilation album in celebration of the 25th anniversary of her entry into music. Two years later she became managing director of a start-up news portal website, Indonesiakini.com.

, Hetty is semi-retired, currently actively performs multiples off air and focuses in performing for charity events. Other than that, she actively contributes in singing competition in multiple events in Indonesia and Malaysia.

Music
Endang sings kroncong, a kind of traditional Indonesian music typified with slow, melancholic melodies and heavy use of string instruments. She has a high, shrill voice. In an interview with The Malay Mail she said that her works are most successful in Japan and the Netherlands.

Legacy
Endang's duet with Ajie Bandi "Damai Tapi Gersang" was selected as the 53rd best Indonesian song of all time by Rolling Stone Indonesia. Singaporean singer Hetty Sarlene is named after her and reportedly began singing Endang's songs by age three.

Personal life
Hetty is married to Yusuf Erwin Faishal. The couple have three children.

Bibliography
Footnotes

References

 

 

 

1957 births
Living people
20th-century Indonesian women singers
Indonesian Muslims
Sundanese people
Minangkabau people
Anugerah Musik Indonesia winners